The V-12 Navy College Training Program was designed to supplement the force of commissioned officers in the United States Navy during World War II. Between July 1, 1943, and June 30, 1946, more than 125,000 participants were enrolled in 131 colleges and universities in the United States. Numerous participants attended classes and lectures at their respective colleges and earned completion degrees for their studies. Some even returned from their naval obligations to earn a degree from the colleges where they were previously stationed.

The V-12 program's goal was to produce officers, not unlike the Army Specialized Training Program (ASTP), which sought to turn out more than 200,000 technically trained personnel in such fields as engineering, foreign languages, and medicine. Running from 1942 to 1944, the ASTP recruits were expected but not required to become officers at the end of their training.

History

The purpose of the V-12 program was to generate a large number of officers for both the U.S. Navy and Marine Corps to meet the demands of World War II, in excess of the number that was turned out annually by the United States Naval Academy at Annapolis and standing U.S. Naval Reserve Midshipmen's School. Once enrollees completed their V-12-subsidized bachelor's degree programs, their next step toward obtaining a commission depended on the service branch:

Navy
 Navy officer candidates were required to complete the V-7 United States Naval Reserve Midshipmen's School program. It was a short course of eight months. The first month was spent at Indoctrination School, a "boot camp" for officer candidates that had Marine Corps drill instructors. Pre-Midshipmen's School was a preparatory four-month course teaching military skills like seamanship, navigation, ordnance, and how to behave like an officer. Midshipmen's School itself taught academic skills and was three months long. Graduates were commissioned as ensigns in the U.S. Naval Reserve and the majority entered into active duty with the U.S. fleet.

Marines
 Marine Corps candidates reported directly to boot camp and were later enrolled in a three-month officer candidate course. Once complete, participants were commissioned as second lieutenants in the Marine Corps.

Inception

When the United States entered the Second World War, American colleges and universities suffered huge enrollment declines. Men of prime draft age who would normally have gone into college (or would have remained enrolled until their course of study was completed) were either drafted, volunteered for service, or dropped out and took jobs in agriculture or war-related industries. As a result, some colleges worried they would have to close their doors for the duration of the conflict.

On October 14, 1942, the American Council on Education issued a report on how best to use colleges and universities for the war effort. The plan recommended that a "college training corps" be established on college and university campuses, that members of the corps be in uniform and receive active-duty pay, and that graduates be trained in technical specialties that were of use to the Army and the Navy. President Franklin D. Roosevelt agreed with this report, and asked the Secretary of War and Secretary of the Navy how best they could use higher education in their mobilization plans. The V-12 Navy college training program and the Army Specialized Training Program were jointly announced on December 12, 1942. The V-12 program found more favor with college administrators than did the ASTP. Unlike the ASTP, V-12 students were allowed to attend classes with civilian students and participate in athletics. The majority of the basic curriculum consisted of classes already taught by civilian instructors. Depending on the V-12 enrollees' past college curriculum, they were enrolled in three school terms, or semesters, which lasted four months each.

Captain Arthur S. Adams, from the Training Division of the Bureau of Naval Personnel, was the officer-in-charge of the V-12 program. Richard Barrett Lowe, future Governor of Guam and American Samoa, was one of its early commanding officers.

Scope

The V-12 program was economically and functionally beneficial to undergraduate colleges and universities in maintaining enrollments during a general mobilization of manpower for the war, and also met and exceeded the critical needs of the military.

Participating institutions

Unlike the ASTP, the Navy predominantly chose small, private colleges for V-12 detachments. Of the 131 institutions selected for line units, approximately 100 could be considered "small," and eighty-eight were private institutions. Eleven were associated with the Roman Catholic Church. Land grant and state flagship universities accounted for only eighteen of the 131 detachments. After the V-12 Program got underway on July 1, 1943, public and private college enrollment increased by 100,000 participants, helping reverse the sharp wartime downward trend.

Midshipman Schools (V-7 Midshipman Program)
 Cornell University
 University of Notre Dame
 Northwestern University
 Villanova University

Line units

Alma College
Arkansas A & M College
Arizona State Teachers College
Baldwin-Wallace College
Bates College
Berea College
Bethany College (Kansas)
Bethany College (West Virginia)
Bloomsburg University
Bowling Green State University
Brown University
Bucknell University
California Institute of Technology
Carroll College
Carson-Newman College
Case School of Applied Science
Central College
Central Michigan University
Central Missouri State Teachers College
Colgate University
College of the Holy Cross
College of St. Thomas
College of the Pacific
Colorado College
Columbia University
Cornell University
Dartmouth College
Denison University
DePauw University
Dickinson State Teachers College
Doane College
Drew University
Duke University
Emory & Henry College
Emory University
Franklin and Marshall College
Georgia Institute of Technology
Gonzaga University
Gustavus Adolphus College
Hampden–Sydney College
Harvard University
Hobart College
Howard College
Iowa State College
Illinois Institute of Technology
Illinois State Normal University
Indiana State Teachers College
John Carroll University
Kansas State Teachers College
Lawrence College
Louisiana Polytechnic Institute
Marquette University
Massachusetts Institute of Technology
Mercer University
Miami University
Middlebury College
Milligan College
Millsaps College
Mississippi College
Missouri Valley College
Montana School of Mines
Mount Saint Mary's College
Muhlenberg College
Murray State Teacher's College
Nebraska State Teachers College
Newberry College
North Dakota State School of Science
North Texas Agricultural College
Northwest Missouri State Teachers College
Northwestern University
Oberlin College
Occidental College
Ohio Wesleyan University
Park College
Pennsylvania State University
Princeton University
Purdue University
Rensselaer Polytechnic Institute
Rice Institute
Saint Ambrose College
St. Lawrence University
St. Mary's College
Southeast Missouri State Teachers College
Southern Methodist University
Southwestern Louisiana Institute
Southwestern University
Stevens Institute of Technology
Swarthmore College
Texas Christian University
Trinity College
Tufts College
Tulane University
Union College
University of California, Berkeley
University of California, Los Angeles
University of Chicago
University of Colorado
University of Dubuque
University of Idaho – Southern Branch
University of Illinois
University of Kansas
University of Louisville
University of Miami
University of Michigan at Ann Arbor
University of Minnesota
University of New Mexico
University of North Carolina at Chapel Hill
University of Notre Dame
University of Oklahoma
University of Pennsylvania
University of Redlands
University of Richmond
University of Rochester
University of South Carolina
University of South Dakota
University of Southern California
University of the South
University of Texas at Austin
University of Utah
University of Virginia
University of Washington
University of Wisconsin–Madison
Ursinus College
Villanova College
Wabash College
Washburn Municipal University
Webb Institute of Naval Architecture
Wesleyan University
West Virginia State College
West Virginia University
Western Michigan College
Westminster College
Whitman College
Willamette University
Williams College
Worcester Polytechnic Institute
Yale University

Medical units

Albany Medical College
Baylor University
Boston University School of Medicine
Cornell University Medical College
College of Medical Evangelists
Creighton University College of Medicine
Duke University School of Medicine
Emory University School of Medicine
George Washington University Medical School
Georgetown University School of Medicine
Hahnemann Medical College
Indiana University School of Medicine, Indianapolis
Jefferson Medical College
Johns Hopkins School of Medicine
Long Island College of Medicine
Louisiana State University
Loyola University - Stritch School of Medicine
Medical College of South Carolina
Medical College of Virginia
Marquette University School of Medicine
New York Medical College
North Pacific College of Oregon
Northwestern University School of Medicine
NYU College of Medicine
Saint Louis University School of Medicine
Southwestern Medical Foundation
Southwestern University
Stanford University School of Medicine
Syracuse University College of Medicine
Temple University School of Medicine
Tulane University School of Medicine
University of Alabama School of Medicine
University of Arkansas College of Medicine
University of Buffalo School of Medicine
University of Chicago School of Medicine
University of Cincinnati College of Medicine
University of Georgia School of Medicine
University of Illinois College of Medicine
University of Kansas School of Medicine
University of Louisville School of Medicine
University of Maryland School of Medicine
University of Michigan Medical College
University of Mississippi School of Medicine
University of Missouri, School of Basic Medical Science
University of Nebraska College of Medicine
University of North Carolina School of Medicine
North Dakota State School of Science
University of Oklahoma College of Medicine
University of Oregon Medical School
University of Pittsburgh School of Medicine
University of Tennessee College of Medicine
University of Texas Medical Branch
University of Utah College of Medicine
University of Vermont College of Medicine
Vanderbilt University School of Medicine
Wake Forest College - Bowman Gray School of Medicine
Wayne State University School of Medicine
Washington University School of Medicine
Yale University School of Medicine

Dental units

Baylor University
College of Physicians and Surgeons (San Francisco)
Creighton University College of Dentistry
Emory University School of Medicine
Indiana University School of Dentistry
Loyola University - Stritch School of Medicine
North Pacific College of Oregon - School of Dentistry
Marquette University School of Dentistry
Ohio State University College of Dentistry
Saint Louis University School of Dentistry
University of Buffalo School of Dentistry
University of Detroit Mercy School of Dentistry
University of Illinois College of Dentistry
University of Louisville School of Dentistry
University of Maryland School of Medicine
University of Minnesota Medical School
University of Missouri–Kansas City School of Dentistry
University of Pittsburgh School of Dental Medicine
University of Tennessee College of Medicine
University of Texas at Houston
Washington University School of Dental Medicine

Theological units

Andover Newton Theological School
Berkeley Baptist Divinity School
Chicago Theological Seminary
Colgate Rochester Divinity School
Columbia Theological Seminary
Dubuque Theological Seminary
Episcopal Theological School
Garrett Biblical Institute
Hartford Theological School
Harvard Divinity School
Lancaster Theological Seminary
Luther Theological Seminary
McCormick Theological Seminary
Oberlin Graduate School of Theology
Pittsburgh-Xenia Theological Seminary
Southern Methodist University
Texas Christian University
University of Chicago Divinity School
Vanderbilt University

Notable graduates

George Allen, football coach (Alma College & Marquette University)
Howard Baker, U.S. Senator from Tennessee (University of the South & Tulane University)
Angelo Bertelli, Notre Dame football star and Heisman Trophy Winner
John Robert Beyster, founder, SAIC, Foundation for Enterprise Development, and Beyster Institute
D. Dudley Bloom, youngest ship commander in the U. S. Navy during World War II; commander of the flagship of the Atlantic fleet; inventor of rolling luggage and reality-based children's toys
Harry Bonk, played college football as a fullback for the University of Maryland from 1945 to 1948, and Dartmouth College and Bucknell University in 1944
Frederick C. Branch, first African American United States Marine Corps officer (Purdue University)
M. Scott Carpenter, Project Mercury astronaut (Colorado College and Saint Mary's College of California).
Earl H. Carroll, United States federal judge in senior status, for the United States District Court for the District of Arizona
Johnny Carson, television personality (Millsaps College & Columbia University)
Warren Christopher, 63rd U.S. Secretary of State (University of Redlands)
Henry S. Coleman (1926–2006), acting dean of Columbia College, Columbia University who was held hostage during the Columbia University protests of 1968.
Jackie Cooper, actor from Los Angeles, California, attained rank of Captain
Roger Corman, filmmaker from Los Angeles, California, (Stanford University)
John Piña Craven, helped pioneer the use of Bayesian search techniques to locate objects lost at sea
Bill Daley, All-American fullback who played for the University of Minnesota Golden Gophers from 1940–1942 and the University of Michigan Wolverines in 1943
Robert V. Daniels, American historian and educator specializing in the history of the Soviet Union
Alvin Dark, Major League Baseball Player and Manager, (LSU & University of Louisiana-Lafayette)
Jeremiah Denton, U.S. Senator, U.S. Navy Rear Admiral, Naval Aviator, Vietnam POW
Alfred J. Eggers, NACA (National Advisory Committee for Aeronautics), NASA
Bump Elliott, American football player, coach, and college athletics administrator, played halfback at Purdue University (1943–1944) and the University of Michigan (1946–1947)
Daniel J. Evans, Senator, Governor
Jim Fitzgerald, businessman and philanthropist (University of Notre Dame)
Aloysius C. Galvin, American Jesuit priest, teacher, administrator, President of the University of Scranton (1965–1970)
Warren Giese, South Carolina legislator and football coach
Bernard M. Gordon, inventor and philanthropist.
Samuel Gravely, first African-American Admiral (UCLA & Columbia University)
Wyndol Gray, American professional basketball player in the 1940s
Peter Hackes, TV Newsman, White House Correspondent
William J. Hadden noted chaplain in both the Army and Navy, minister and desegregationist
John Woodland Hastings, leader in the field of photobiology, especially bioluminescence, and one of the founders of the field of circadian biology
Wilmot N. Hess, physicist, NASA Apollo moon missions, National Oceanic and Atmospheric Administration (NOAA) hurricane research and oil spill cleanup
Bruce Hilkene, captain and starting left tackle of the undefeated 1947 Michigan Wolverines football team
Elroy Hirsch, LA Rams Football Great
Edward Kean, creator and writer of the Howdy Doody Show. (Cornell University and Columbia University) 
Robert F. Kennedy, U.S. Attorney General, U.S. Senator (Bates College & Harvard University)
E. Henry Knoche, deputy director of the CIA, from 1976 to 1977, and acting Director of Central Intelligence in 1977
Bowie Kuhn, Baseball Commissioner (Franklin & Marshall College & Princeton University)
Melvin Laird, Secretary of Defense
John Black Lee, architect in New Canaan, Connecticut
Jack Lemmon, actor (Harvard University)
Charles Mathias, Senator
James McClure, Senator
Sam Mele, right fielder, manager, coach and scout in Major League Baseball, led the Minnesota Twins to their first American League championship in 1965
Wayne E. Meyer, regarded as the "Father of Aegis" for his service as the Aegis Weapon System Manager, founding project manager of the Aegis Shipbuilding Project Office
William Middendorf II, Ambassador, Secretary of the Navy
Frank N. Mitchell, Marine First Lieutenant who posthumously received the United States' highest military decoration – the Medal of Honor for his heroic actions during the Korean War
Dade William Moeller, American health physicist, radiation and environmental protection scientist
Daniel Patrick Moynihan, U.S. Senator from New York (Tufts University)
Fred Negus, played college football for University of Wisconsin and University of Michigan and professional in the All-America Football Conference and the National Football League
 Clarence Charles Newcomer (1923–2005), US District Judge of the United States District Court for the Eastern District of Pennsylvania 
Paul Newman, actor, entered the program at Ohio University but had to drop out because of color blindness
David "Sam" Peckinpah, film director (University of Louisiana-Lafayette)
Frank Pellegrino (inventor), inventor and president of General Fibre Company
Sidney Phillips, author, physician, U.S. Marine
William Dale Phillips, chemist, nuclear magnetic resonance spectroscopist, federal science policy advisor and member of the National Academy of Sciences
Robert C. Pierpoint, TV Newsman, White House Correspondent
Victor Prather, American flight surgeon famous for taking part in "Project RAM", a government project to develop the space suit
John Prchlik, NFL Player – Detroit Lions
Al Rosen, Major League Baseball Player and Executive
Carl T. Rowan, Columnist, TV Personality, Ambassador
Harold Lyman Ryan, served as a federal judge on the United States District Court for the District of Idaho
Leo Ryan, U.S. Congressman killed in Guyana immediately before the Jonestown Massacre (Bates College)
Kenneth G. Ryder, president of Northeastern University from 1975-1989
Pierre Salinger, Newsman, Presidential Press Secretary
Phillip Shriver, historian and college administrator who was president of Miami University in Oxford, Ohio, 1965–1981
Leon Silver, geologist who was instrumental in training the Apollo Program astronauts in field geology.
G. William Skinner, leading American anthropologist and scholar of China
Eugene Sledge, Author, U.S. Marine
William Styron, novelist and essayist (Duke University)
Hugh Taylor, professional football player and coach
Robert Lawson Vaught, mathematical logician, and one of the founders of model theory
James Logan Waters, founder of Waters Corporation, a publicly traded laboratory analytical instrument and software company
William Webster, Federal Judge, Director, CIA and FBI
Thomas Grey "Tom" Wicker, Columnist and Author
Roger Williams, Musician, Entertainer
William W. Winpisinger, president of the million-member International Association of Machinists and Aerospace Workers
Benjamin Drake Wright American psychometrician, largely responsible for the widespread adoption of Georg Rasch's measurement principles and models
Zig Ziglar, author, salesperson, and motivational speaker (University of South Carolina).

See also

 Navy–Notre Dame football rivalry, a surviving legacy of the V-12 program
 Aviation Cadet Training Program (USN)

References

Further reading
 Cardozier, V. R. Colleges and Universities in World War II (1993) online
 Westerlund, John S. "Anchors Aweigh: The U.S. Navy's WWII Port of Call at Flagstaff," Journal of Arizona History (2002) 43#1 pp 69–86. Arizona State Teachers College (now Northern Arizona University)

External links
 V-12 History
 Luray, Rhonda - Training the world's greatest Navy, 2004
 All Hands Naval Bulletin - July, 1943
 The Navy College Training Program V-12: Curricula Schedules, Course Descriptions – Google Books
 Navy V-12 Bulletin – Google Books
 Navy V-12 – Google Books
 Continuance of Navy V-12 College Training Program – Google Books
 Wartime College Training Programs of the Armed Services – Google Books

History of the United States Navy
United States Navy schools and training